The Allendale School District is a community public school district that serves students in pre-kindergarten through eighth grade in the Borough of Allendale, in Bergen County, New Jersey, United States.

As of the 2020–21 school year, the district, comprised of two schools, had an enrollment of 859 students and 69.0 classroom teachers (on an FTE basis), for a student–teacher ratio of 12.4:1.

The district is classified by the New Jersey Department of Education as being in District Factor Group "I", the second-highest of eight groupings. District Factor Groups organize districts statewide to allow comparison by common socioeconomic characteristics of the local districts. From lowest socioeconomic status to highest, the categories are A, B, CD, DE, FG, GH, I and J.

There are two schools, one primary school for grades PreK-3 and one upper elementary school for grades 4-8, with the middle school program located within the Brookside building. The administration of the schools includes district-wide services through the Superintendent of Schools and the Board Secretary / Business Administrator. Additionally, in each school the administration includes a principal.

For high school, public school students in Allendale for grades nine through twelve attend Northern Highlands Regional High School, which also serves students from Ho-Ho-Kus, Upper Saddle River and some students from  Saddle River (who have the option of attending either Northern Highlands or Ramsey High School, as part of sending/receiving relationships with the two districts). As of the 2020–21 school year, the high school had an enrollment of 1,364 students and 106.3 classroom teachers (on an FTE basis), for a student–teacher ratio of 12.8:1. New Jersey Monthly magazine ranked the high school as the 22nd-best of 328 ranked schools in New Jersey in its 2012 rankings of the "Top Public High Schools" after being ranked 6th of 322 schools in 2010.

History
Through the start of the 1957-58 school year, students from Allendale, Mahwah, Saddle River and Upper Saddle River all attended Ramsey High School as part of sending/receiving relationships with the respective districts and the Ramsey Public School District. Allendale, Mahwah and Upper Saddle River left the Ramsey district in September 1958 once Mahwah High School was completed; Allendale and Upper Saddle River joined the Northern Highlands District once the school was opened in 1965.

Awards and recognition
NAMM named the district in its 2008 survey of the "Best Communities for Music Education", which included 110 school districts nationwide.

Schools 

Schools in the district (with 2020–21 enrollment data from the National Center for Education Statistics.) are:
Hillside School with 343 students in pre-kindergarten to 3rd grade
Anastasia Maroulis, Principal
Brookside School with 506 students from 4th to 8th grades
Bruce Winkelstein, Principal

Administration 
Core members of the district's administration are:
Dr. Michael J. Barcadepone, Superintendent
Maria L. Engeleit, Business Administrator / Board Secretary

Board of education
The district's board of education is comprised of five members who set policy and oversee the fiscal and educational operation of the district through its administration. As a Type II school district, the board's trustees are elected directly by voters to serve three-year terms of office on a staggered basis, with either one or two seats up for election each year held (since 2012) as part of the November general election. The board appoints a superintendent to oversee the district's day-to-day operations and a business administrator to supervise the business functions of the district.

In 2012, school elections were shifted from April to the November general election as part of an effort to reduce the costs of a standalone April vote.

References

External links 
Allendale Public Schools

School Data for the Allendale Public Schools, National Center for Education Statistics
Northern Highlands Regional High School

Allendale, New Jersey
New Jersey District Factor Group I
School districts in Bergen County, New Jersey